Chris Zoricich (born 3 May 1969) is a New Zealand association football player who represented the New Zealand national football team in the 1980s and 1990s. Born to Croat parents, he began playing football in his native Auckland for Blockhouse Bay Under-7's and went on to play over 50 times for his country.

Club career 

"Zorro" began his senior career with Papatoetoe in Auckland before moving to Leyton Orient in England between 1990–1993. He made 59 first team appearances there, and 12 as a substitute during his time in East London, before he was made to return home due to work permit restrictions. A group of Orient fans protested outside the home office to try to keep him in the country.

In 1994, Chris returned to New Zealand to play for Central United, a Croatian-influenced team. His brother, Michael (who played Davis Cup tennis for New Zealand), and his father, Ivan, also turned out for Central at various points. However it was not long before Zoricich was on the move again, this time to Brisbane Strikers in the Australian National Soccer League. He spent two seasons in Australia before heading to England to try his luck again. He made one appearance for Welling United in the Vauxhall Conference and also had a trial spell with Chelsea, at that time managed by Ruud Gullit. During his time at Stamford Bridge, Chris never made the first team but was a regular in the reserve side's defence.

Chris returned to Australia to re-sign for the Brisbane Strikers in 1997, after the club had won the NSL championship on their home ground. He then ended his NSL career by playing for Newcastle Breakers and Newcastle United, before returning to England as his English wife was homesick. After trialling with League Two side, Mansfield Town, he signed for Margate in the Nationwide Conference and then moved on to St Albans City in the Conference South Division. This was followed by short spells at Harlow Town, Boreham Wood, Heybridge Swifts and Wealdstone.

International career 

Zoricich made his international debut against Israel on 27 March 1988. He went on to win 57 caps in full 'A' internationals, including captaining the All Whites at the 1999 Confederations Cup in Mexico and the 2003 Confederations Cup in France. His only international goal was in a 1–2 loss to USA in June 1999 at the Confederations Cup.

International goals
Scores and results list New Zealand's goal tally first.

After International football 
Zoricich as of 2014 is the premier football coach a Saint Kentigern College in Auckland.

References

External links 

 

1969 births
Association footballers from Auckland
Living people
New Zealand association footballers
New Zealand people of Croatian descent
New Zealand international footballers
National Soccer League (Australia) players
Papatoetoe AFC players
Leyton Orient F.C. players
Central United F.C. players
Brisbane Strikers FC players
Welling United F.C. players
Chelsea F.C. players
Sydney Olympic FC players
Newcastle Jets FC players
Margate F.C. players
St Albans City F.C. players
Harlow Town F.C. players
Boreham Wood F.C. players
Wealdstone F.C. players
Association football defenders
1996 OFC Nations Cup players
1998 OFC Nations Cup players
1999 FIFA Confederations Cup players
2000 OFC Nations Cup players
2002 OFC Nations Cup players
2003 FIFA Confederations Cup players